Greg Harden is a life coach, motivational speaker and executive consultant who is best known for his work with 7-time Super Bowl champion quarterback Tom Brady. He also worked with Heisman Trophy winner and Super Bowl MVP Desmond Howard, and 23-time Olympic gold medalist Michael Phelps. Brady, Howard and other athletes credit Harden with inspiring them to overcome obstacles and achieve success in their professional and personal lives.  Harden has created a personal improvement program that is unique in sports. In 2014, he was profiled in a segment on 60 Minutes.

Besides sports, Harden has provided performance coaching to corporate executives and community leaders.

Early life and education
Harden was an all-city and all-state track athlete at Southwestern High School in Detroit and was recruited to the University of Michigan in 1967 but dropped out of school to start a family. After taking jobs working in a steel mill and as a TV cameraman, in 1976 he was hired to be a counselor at a residential drug and alcohol treatment center in Ypsilanti, Michigan.  During this time Harden returned to study at the University of Michigan and received a bachelor's degree in general studies in 1981.  He worked as a clinical therapist at an Ypsilanti hospital from 1981 to 1986, and again went back to the University of Michigan to get his master's degree in social work.

Career
Harden began work as a student-athlete counselor in 1986 when Michigan football coach Bo Schembechler brought him in after hearing of the work Harden was doing in Ypsilanti, helping people deal with the challenges of everyday life and work.  In the years since, Harden has been named associate Athletic Director and Director of Athletic Counseling for the University of Michigan Athletic Department.  He meets with hundreds of athletes every year, supervising 31 different sports, all while managing a multimillion-dollar department budget.

Harden has worked with some of the greatest athletes and coaches of all time in their respective sports, including Tom Brady, Desmond Howard, Jalen Rose, and Olympic legend Michael Phelps.

Desmond Howard won the Heisman Trophy in 1991.  Howard describes Harden's influence as:  “If Greg Harden wasn’t at the University of Michigan…I don’t win the Heisman.” 

In the late 1990s, Harden also worked closely with Tom Brady, future NFL Hall-of-Fame quarterback and seven-time Super Bowl champion, five-time Super Bowl MVP.   Brady mentioned that Harden does not always embrace traditional philosophies on coaching and training, which Brady appreciated.  In interviews Brady has mentioned Harden's influence:  “He will always be somebody I rely on for sound advice and mentorship.  He has helped me with my own personal struggles in both athletics and in life.  Greg really pushed me in a direction that I wasn’t sure I could go.” 

Before the 2008 Olympic Summer Games, Harden worked with Michael Phelps and his swimming coach Bob Bowman, and Bowman credits Harden for helping him to communicate better with Phelps.  Bowman said of Harden:  “He’s a miracle worker.  He made me a better coach and a better person.”

Warde Manuel was a football player from 1986 to 1989 and is now the athletic director at the University of Michigan.  Manuel said of Harden:  “We’re better off because of Greg.  I’m a much better husband, man, and father.  Because of [him], we got the edge that takes us the half-step to becoming better people.”

Nik Stauskas was a first round NBA draft pick in 2014 by the Sacramento Kings.  Stauskas said of Harden:  “[He’s] the main reason why I would say I’m a different person and a different player.   If you master your mind, you master the game of basketball.”

Harden Philosophy
Harden has this phrase framed on his office desk:  “Control the controllables.”  It's no use railing against the system, or against circumstance, Harden says. You can only change what's within.

Harden:  “My real obsession is to convince an individual that they have to determine for themselves what sort of man, what sort of woman, what sort of person they want to be.  The goal is to make people experts on themselves.”

References

External links
http://www.detroitnews.com/article/20140902/SPORTS0201/309020039
http://archive.freep.com/article/20140427/COL24/304270098/Carol-Cain-Warde-Manuel-credits-U-M-showing-him-what-do-UConn
http://usatoday30.usatoday.com/sports/college/football/2011-06-13-1482840748_x.htm
http://www.mgoblue.com/genrel/greg_harden_850266.html

University of Michigan alumni
Sportspeople from Michigan
American motivational speakers
Living people
Year of birth missing (living people)